"Tell Me" is a song by American R&B singer Bobby Valentino. It was released in the summer of 2005, as the second single from his debut album. The remix of the song features Lil Wayne from Bobby Valentino. The song sampled "For the World" composed by Tan Dun on the Hero soundtrack, starring Jet Li. British R&B singer Stevie Hoang's song No Games sampled from the same source.

Music video
The video directed by Erik White featured a remixed version with rapper Lil Wayne, but that version was not featured on the album.

Charts

Weekly charts

Year-end charts

References

2005 singles
Bobby V songs
Lil Wayne songs
Def Jam Recordings singles
Songs written by Bob Robinson (songwriter)
Songs written by Tim Kelley
2005 songs
Song recordings produced by Tim & Bob
Music videos directed by Erik White